Old Western Rājasthāni (also known as Maru-Gurjari, Old Gujarātī) is the ancestor of the modern Gujarati and Rajasthani languages which developed from Sanskrit and the Prakrit Apabhraṃśas, and was spoken around 8-14 centuries in Western India. The literary form of Old Western Rājasthāni, the Dingala language was in use as early as the 12th century. While the spoken Old Western Rajasthani gave way to medieval forms of Rajasthani and Gujarati, it flourished in its literary form as Dingala till the 19th century. 

Early texts of the language display characteristic features such as direct/oblique noun forms, postpositions, and auxiliary verbs. It had three genders, as Gujarati does today, and by around the time of 1300 CE, a fairly standardized form of this language emerged. The belief that modern Rajasthani sporadically expressed a neuter gender was based on the incorrect conclusion that the [ũ] that came to be pronounced in some areas for masculine [o] after a nasal consonant was analogous to Gujarati's neuter [ũ]. A formal grammar, Prakrita Vyakarana, of the precursor to this language, Gurjar Apabhraṃśa, was written by Jain monk and eminent scholar Acharya Hemachandra Suri in the reign of Chaulukya king Jayasimha Siddharaja of Anhilwara (Patan).

Literature
Major works were written in various genres, for the most part in verse form, such as:
rāsa, predominantly didactic narrative, of which the earliest known is Śālibhadrasūri's Bhārateśvarabāhubali (1185).
phāgu, in which springtime is celebrated, of which the earliest is Jinapadmasūri's Sirithūlibadda (c. 1335). The most famous is the Vasantavilāsa, of unknown authorship, which is undeterminedly dated to somewhere in 14th or 15th century, or possibly earlier.
bārmāsī, describing natural beauty during each of the twelve months.
ākhyāna, in which sections are each in a single metre.

Narsinh Mehta (c. 1414–1480) is traditionally viewed as the father of modern Gujarati poetry. By virtue of its early age and good editing, an important prose work is the 14th-century commentary of Taruṇaprabha, the Ṣaḍāvaśyakabālabodhavr̥tti.

Phonology
The retroflex lateral flap (ḷ) is generally absent, which is however rather common in Modern Gujarati. This may indicate that it was a later re-introduction, perhaps under the influence of Marathi with the Maratha rule.

References

Further reading

Bender, E. (1992) The Salibhadra-Dhanna-Carita: A Work in Old Gujarati Critically Edited and Translated, with a Grammatical Analysis and Glossary. American Oriental Society: New Haven, Conn. 
.
Dave, T.N. (1935) A Study of the Gujarati Language in the XVth Century. The Royal Asiatic Society. 
Tessitori, L.P. (1914–1916) "Notes on the Grammar of Old Western Rajasthani." Indian Antiquary. 43–45.
 Cardona, George and Suthar, Babu. 2003. Gujarati. In Cardona, George and Jain, Dhanesh (eds.), The Indo-Aryan Languages, 659-697. London: Routledge.

Gujarati language
Indo-Aryan languages
Cultural history of Gujarat
Rajasthani language